Highland Creek is a river in the Scarborough district of Toronto, Ontario, emptying into Lake Ontario at the eastern end of the Scarborough Bluffs. It is home to several species of fish including trout, carp, bass and salmon. It is a meandering river which, like most rivers in Toronto (including the Don and Humber), travels through a glacial ravine formed after the last Ice Age. The Highland Creek watershed, including tributaries, is almost entirely contained within Scarborough.

Naming
According to a 1796 list of Mississauga names of rivers and creeks compiled by British surveyor Augustus Jones, the river was known as Yat-qui-i-be-no-nick, which translates as "creek comes out under high." There is no documented source for the name "Highland Creek", but some suggest it is of descriptive origins, possibly recalling the Highlands of Scotland where many early settlers of the area came from.

Hydrology
Highland Creek consists of four branches, treated here in order from west to east. The names used for the branches indicate only geographic position, and should not be taken as proper names.

It flows south, then south-east and passes under the intersection of Midland Avenue and Huntingwood Drive. The branch continues east under Brimley Road, then parallels the road south until just north of the Canadian Pacific Railway tracks. The entire length of the branch is artificially channelled and straightened, and much of it lined with a concrete bed. This was done in the 1970s after a scare about mosquitoes carrying encephalitis breeding in stagnant creek water (see also "Threats from Development" below).

This is the most northerly point of any part of the Highland Creek system including all tributaries. It flows south-east under Finch Avenue East, McCowan Road and Middlefield Road. The entire length up to this point has been artificially channelled, straightened and lined with a concrete bed. The next  stretch, however, a crescent shape that proceeds east to a point just west of Markham Road and which had been previously altered, has now been restored to a more natural state with gentle meanders and shallow pools.

The branch flows south east, then east under Middlefield to  where a short  tributary branch running south joins it. It then flows south-east under the Canadian Pacific Railway tracks, Finch Avenue and Markham Road, then south-east under Highway 401. From this point on, it flows in a natural bed and ravine. It then travels  to the confluence with the west branch. The branch then travels south-east under Military Trail, the first crossing point north of Lake Ontario built in the early settlement period, and Ellesmere Road. It travels east through the park, under Morningside Avenue and past some of the outdoor sports facilities and the Miller Lash House of the University of Toronto Scarborough.

It travels south south-east to Ellesmere Road, before entering a culvert. The branch then emerges east of Meadowvale Road south of Ellesmere, before heading south-west under Kingston Road and Highway 2A. After a further , it turns south and is joined by a small stream just before Lawrence Avenue East. It passes under the road and continues south until it joins the central branch just north of Lake Ontario. Unlike the other parts of the creek system, this branch does not flow through any deep ravines.

Highland Creek Wetland Complex
At the mouth of the Creek are four wetlands totaling  in size. The Stephenson’s Swamp is both a designated Environmental Significant Area and a Provincially Significant Wetland. According to the Toronto and Region Conservation Authority, the type of forest swamp used to be the most common type of wetland on Lake Ontario prior to European settlement but are now rare. It is a breeding area for several uncommon species, including the blue-gray gnatcatcher and the yellow-spotted salamander. There are three other designated Environmental Significant Areas in the Highland Creek watershed: Highland Forest, Hague Park and the Morningside Park Forest.

Tributaries
West Highland Creek
Bellamy Ravine Creek
Southwest Highland Creek

Threats from development
Due to development in Scarborough, which has substantially increased the amount of water that historically travelled through the river, there are a number of artificial diversions (use of control channels) to decrease erosion and guide the river past obstacles. For example, there are a large number of areas where the river is lined with rock cages. There are small dams to even out the flow in areas where upstream storage reservoirs are possible, increasing its depth. The river travels through culverts under some major streets. In addition, many of the city's storm sewers drain into the river. The valley of Highland Creek contains a number of interconnected parks which have a system of paved bike and walking paths. As a result of these numerous channel modification projects, mostly implemented in the 1960s and 1970s, much of the creek does not follow its natural path. This is in contrast to the nearby Rouge River, which has fewer in-stream barriers and extensive riparian and floodplain vegetation, and where a wider variety of wildlife, including some climax forest species, can be found.

History
Like many creeks and river valleys in Toronto, evidence of First Nations occupation has been found in this area. A 2005 excavation by the Toronto and Region Conservation Authority near the mouth of Highland Creek found evidence of a Late Woodland or Early Archaic site, thought to have been a place of tool manufacture. The Helliwell family, one of the first settlers in the area, accumulated a large number of artifacts from the last 5,000 years.

Highland Creek historically formed a natural barrier to transportation in the eastern part of Scarborough, with the single exception of Military Trail, blocking the eastern sections of Lawrence Avenue East (at two locations), Morningside Avenue, and Kingston Road until the construction of longer-span bridges beginning in 1937 (Kingston Road) and continuing through the mid-1960s (Lawrence Avenue East, Ellesmere Road). During the early part of the 20th century, it also blocked the progression of the Toronto and Scarboro' Electric Railway, Light and Power Company line along Kingston Road, which was unable to negotiate the grade into the creek where it met Kingston Road.

During the late 1940s and early 1950s, a new town plan developed in the valley between Kingston Road and the eastern crossing of Lawrence Avenue. The primary road remains as the park access road to Colonel Danforth Park, but the remainder, with few exceptions, was washed out during Hurricane Hazel in October 1954.

Communities along the creek
Highland Creek is also the name of a neighbourhood on the east side of the creek at Old Kingston Road. Opposite the former village of Highland Creek is West Hill, named for its position on the tablelands above the valley.

See also
List of rivers of Ontario

References

External links
Friends of the Highland Creek (FOHC)

Rivers of Toronto
Scarborough, Toronto
Tributaries of Lake Ontario
First Nations sites in Toronto